William Dietz may refer to:

 William C. Dietz (born 1945), science fiction author
 William Dietz (politician) (1778–1848), U.S. Representative from New York
 William Henry Dietz (1884–1964), American football player and coach